Peter Josef Dietzgen (December 9, 1828April 15, 1888) was a German socialist philosopher, Marxist and journalist. Dietzgen was born in Blankenberg in the Rhine Province of Prussia. He was the first of five children of father Johann Gottfried Anno Dietzgen (1794–1887) and mother Anna Margaretha Lückerath (1808–1881). He was, like his father, a tanner by profession; inheriting his uncle's business in Siegburg. Entirely self-educated, he developed the notion of dialectical materialism independently from Marx and Engels as an independent philosopher of socialist theory. He had one son, Eugene Dietzgen.

Life as revolutionary and philosopher
Early on in his youth, Joseph Dietzgen worked with the famed Forty-Eighters of the 1848 German Revolution. It was there that he first met Karl Marx and other socialist revolutionaries, and began his career as a socialist philosopher. Following the failure of the 1848 Revolution he spent some time in the United States from 1849 to 1851, returning once again for a visit from 1859 to 1861. While in the New World he traversed the American South and witnessed first hand the lynchings which had come to characterize the slave states. During the period between his travels, Dietzgen joined the Alliance of Communists with Karl Marx back in Germany in 1852. In 1853, after marrying his wife Cordula Finke, he established his tannery business in Winterscheid (today part of Ruppichteroth), Germany. When he returned to the United States in 1859 he set up another tannery in Montgomery, Alabama. From 1864 to 1868, he lived with his son Eugene in St. Petersburg, where he was manager of the state tannery. He worked with the Tsar of Russia on improvement of the Russian methods. During his time spent in Russia he wrote one of his earliest texts, The Nature of Human Brain-Work, which was published in 1869. Upon his first reading of the text, Marx forwarded a copy to Engels, remarking, "My opinion is that J. Dietzgen would do better to condense all his ideas into two printer's sheets and have them published under his own name as a tanner. If he publishes them in the size he is proposing, he will discredit himself with his lack of dialectical development and his way of going round in circles." While he traveled, his wife managed the family tannery business back in Germany until he returned in mid-1869. Once he was back home, he was visited by Marx and his daughter, who proclaimed that Joseph had become "the Philosopher" of socialism. By 1870, Marx had embraced Dietzgen as a friend, and later praised him and his theory of dialectical materialism in the 2nd edition of the first volume of Das Kapital.

On June 8, 1878, Dietzgen was arrested following the publication of a lecture he gave in Cologne: The future of the social democracy. He spent 3 months in prison on remand before his trial was held. Although Joseph was released along with copies of his article, he was re-arrested twice and finally released. In 1881 Joseph sent his son Eugene to the United States in order to avoid the Kaiser's upcoming army draft, to safeguard his articles and documents, as well as to secure a family home in the new world. Young Eugene was 19 when he arrived in New York, but quickly jump started a thriving family business in Chicago, the Eugene Dietzgen Company. It became one of the world's top drafting and surveying supply manufacturers and distributors and remained such through most of the 20th century. The company still exists today as a division of Nashua Paper, and its two buildings still stand in Chicago's now trendy Printer's Row and Lincoln Park areas. During this period, Eugene and Joseph kept in close contact through extensive letters which are currently being documented and published. In the same year, Joseph ran for the elections of the German Reichstag (the parliament), but emigrated in 1884 to New York City. He moved to Chicago two years later, where he became editor at the Arbeiterzeitung. Unfortunately Joseph's death in 1888 marked an end to his son's dependency, but his family line would continue to be part of some of the biggest engagements of the 20th century; from World War I, to the 1936 Berlin Olympics, to the heart of World War II.

Dietzgen's words and life have for some underscored the unity that existed on the political left at the time of the First International, before Anarchists, Revolutionaries, and Social Democrats were later divided: "For my part, I lay little stress on the distinction, whether a man is an anarchist or a socialist, because it seems to me that too much weight is attributed to this difference." In this, he acted to reconcile anarchists and Marxists (see Anarchism and Marxism).

Dietzgen was later figured on a stamp by the German Democratic Republic.

Dialectical materialism
Dietzgen's most important contribution to Marxism was arguably his philosophical theory of dialectical materialism, a means of understanding the world which draws from Feuerbach's materialism and Hegel's dialectic. The same principles were developed independently by Karl Marx and Friedrich Engels and applied to their writings, of which the Communist Manifesto in particular had great influence on Dietzgen before he began writing.

His works were quoted extensively by Lenin in the latter's philosophical polemic, Materialism and Empiriocriticism – notably the second to last work as against the very last, which is ignored entirely. Hence a list of Dietzgen's relevant philosophical works with accompanying dates of composition – not publication – can help to elucidate his philosophical evolution. He is also mentioned four times in Lenin's late Philosophical Notebooks (Collected Works, Vol. 38., Lawrence & Wishart, 1980) e.g. on pages 403 - 406 alongside Feuerbach.

Georgi Plekhanov wrote on Dietzgen's philosophy, and this quotation with the quotation within it may be useful to provide the setting for the kind of arguments that his work provoked:

"Now to Joseph Dietzgen. His son, Eugene Dietzgen, in a preface to the Russian translation, also describes his father’s philosophical teaching as an important supplement to Marxism (p iv). He says:

If the founders of historical materialism, and their followers, in a whole series of convincing historical investigations, proved the connection between economic and spiritual development, and the dependence of the latter, in the final analysis, on economic relations, nevertheless they did not prove that this dependence of the spirit is rooted in its nature and in the nature of the universe. Marx and Engels thought that they had ousted the last spectres of idealism from the understanding of history. This was a mistake, for the metaphysical spectres found a niche for themselves in the unexplained essence of the human spirit and in the universal whole which is closely associated with the latter. Only a scientifically verified criticism of cognition could eject idealism from here. (p iv)

Despite all our respect for the noble memory of the German worker-philosopher, and despite our personal sympathy for his son, we find ourselves compelled to protest resolutely against the main idea of the preface from which we have just quoted. In it, the relationship of Joseph Dietzgen to Marx and Engels is quite wrongly stated"

Plekhanov may be arguing more with the son and the translator here rather than Joseph Dietzgen, however. Note the following observation on logic by Joseph Dietzgen:

The red thread winding through all these letters deals with the following points: The instrument of thought is a thing like all other common things, a part or attribute of the universe. It belongs particularly to the general category of being and is an apparatus which produces a detailed picture of human experience by categorical classification or distinction. In order to use this apparatus [Pg 255]correctly, one must fully grasp the fact that the world unit is multiform and that all multiformity is a unit.

It is the solution of the riddle of the ancient Eleatic philosophy: How can the one be contained in the many, and the many in one?

This explicit evocation of the Eleatics (Parmenides, Zeno of Elea and Melissus of Samos) does in fact seem to set Dietzgen apart from the mainstream of dialectical materialism that emerged from the works of Marx and Engels. It also seems to collide with current ideas about the "multiverse" common in scientific cosmology.

One of the more obvious problems of writing about a dialectical materialist philosopher like Dietzgen is the sheer lack of mainstream citations and reviews as third-party sources, which at least to an extent is due to political antagonism in the academy and, one might suppose, the lack of commercial pressure.

Death
Dietzgen died at home smoking a cigar. He had taken a stroll in Lincoln Park, and was having a political discussion in a "vivacious and excited" manner about the "imminent collapse of capitalist production". He stopped in mid-sentence with his hand in the air – dead of paralysis of the heart. He is currently buried at the Waldheim Cemetery (now Forest Home Cemetery), in Forest Park, Chicago, a few feet away from the Haymarket Martyrs.

Major works

 Das Wesen der menschlichen Kopfarbeit, 1869, engl "The Nature of Human Brainwork",
 "The Religion of Social Democracy" (in six sermons from 1870 to 1875).
 "Scientific Socialism" (1873).
 "The Ethics of Social Democracy" (1875).
 "Social Democratic Philosophy" (1876).
 "The Inconceivable: a Special Chapter in Social-Democratic Philosophy" (1877).
 "The Limits of Cognition" (1877).
 "Our Professors on the Limits of Cognition" (1878).
 "Letters on Logic" (addressed to Eugen Dietzgen) (1880–1884).
 "Excursions of a Socialist into the Domain of Epistemology" (1886).
 "The Positive Outcome of Philosophy" (1887).

More recent editions:

Nature of Human Brain Work: An Introduction to Dialectics, Left Bank Books, Reprint 1984
Philosophical Essays on Socialism and Science, Religion, Ethics; Critique-Of-Reason and the World-At-Large, Kessinger Publications, 2004, 
The Positive Outcome of Philosophy; The Nature of Human Brain Work; Letters on Logic, Kessinger Publications, 2007,

Collected writings
 Josef Dietzgen, Sämtliche Schriften, hrsg. von Eugen Dietzgen, 4. Auflage, Berlin, 1930
 Joseph Dietzgen, Schriften in drei Bänden, hrsg. von der Arbeitsgruppe für Philosophie an der Akademie der Wissenschaften der DDR zu Berlin, Berlin, 1961–1965

Secondary literature
English
Anton Pannekoek: "The Standpoint and Significance of Josef Dietzgen's Philosophical Works" – Introduction to Joseph Dietzgen, The Positive Outcome of Philosophy, Chicago, 1928

German
 SPD-Protokollnotizen S. 176; Liebknecht 1988, Biographisches Lexikon 1970, Dietzgen 1930, Friedrich Ebert-Stiftung, Digitale Bibliothek
 P. Dr. Gabriel Busch O.S.B.: Im Spiegel der Sieg, Verlag Abtei Michaelsberg, Siegburg 1979
 Josef Dietzgen, Sämtliche Schriften, hrsg. von Eugen Dietzgen, 4. Auflage, Berlin, 1930
 Joseph Dietzgen, Schriften in drei Bänden, hrsg. von der Arbeitsgruppe für Philosophie an der Akademie der Wissenschaften der DDR zu Berlin, Berlin, 1961–1965
 Otto Finger, Joseph Dietzgen – Beitrag zu den Leistungen des deutschen Arbeiterphilosophen, Berlin, 1977
 Gerhard Huck, Joseph Dietzgen (1828–1888) – Ein Beitrag zur Ideengeschichte des Sozialismus im 19. Jahrhundert, in der Reihe Geschichte und Gesellschaft, Bochumer Historische Schriften, Band 22, Stuttgart, 1979, 
 Horst Gräbner, Joseph Dietzgens publizistische Tätigkeit, unveröffentlichte Magisterarbeit an der J-W-G-Universität, Frankfurt/M, 1982
 Anton Pannekoek, "Die Stellung u. Bedeutung von J. Dietzgens philosophischen Arbeiten" in: Josef Dietzgen, Das Wesen der menschlichen Kopfarbeit ; Eine abermalige Kritik der reinen und praktischen Vernunft, Stuttgart: J. H. W. Dietz Nachf., 1903

Dutch
 Jasper Schaaf, De dialectisch-materialistische filosofie van Joseph Dietzgen, Kampen, 1993

References

External links

Joseph Dietzgen Archive
Dietzgen Family History Page includes interviews with Dietzgen's granddaughter and 145 page typescript of Dietzgen's 1880-84 correspondence with his son
Joseph Dietzgen's Philosophy
Eugene Dietzgen Corporation History Page
 
 

1828 births
1888 deaths
People from Hennef (Sieg)
People from the Rhine Province
German atheists
Members of the International Workingmen's Association
19th-century philosophers
Marxist theorists
Atheist philosophers
Materialists
American Marxists
19th-century atheists
Burials at Forest Home Cemetery, Chicago